Rampurhat Girls' High School is higher secondary school for girls at Rampurhat of Birbhum district of West Bengal.

See also
Education in India
List of schools in India
Education in West Bengal

References

External links

Schools in Birbhum district
Girls' schools in West Bengal
1900 establishments in India